Pike v. Bruce Church, Inc., 397 U.S. 137 (1970), was a case in which the Supreme Court of the United States held that power of states to pass laws interfering with interstate commerce is limited when the law poses an undue burden on businesses.

Background
An Arizona statute required that Arizona-grown cantaloupes advertise their state of origin on each package. Bruce Church, Inc. was an Arizona grower of high quality cantaloupes. Instead of packing them in Arizona, it transported them to nearby California facilities, where they were not labeled as grown in Arizona.

Arizona issued an order prohibiting Church from shipping uncrated cantaloupes from the Arizona ranch, and requiring that the cantaloupes be packed in Arizona and identified as coming from an Arizona packer. This would have cost Church $200,000 to pack a $700,000 crop.

The company then brought a suit in federal court to stop Arizona from enforcing the order prohibiting Church from shipping the cantaloupes.

Opinion of the Court
State statutes that have a negative effect on interstate commerce are unconstitutional under the Dormant Commerce Clause. Justice Stewart used a balancing test.

Applying this test to the Arizona statute, the court found it imposed too great of a burden to justify its benefits.

See also
 List of United States Supreme Court cases
 List of United States Supreme Court cases, volume 397
 List of United States Supreme Court cases by the Burger Court

References

External links
 

United States Constitution Article One case law
United States Supreme Court cases
United States Supreme Court cases of the Burger Court
United States Dormant Commerce Clause case law
1970 in United States case law
Cantaloupe
Agriculture in Arizona